Charles Tarrant (1723–1791)   was an Anglican priest.

Tarrant was educated at Balliol College, Oxford. He held incumbencies at North Tidworth, the City of Westminster, Staines, Bloomsbury, Lamberhurst and Wrotham. He was Dean of Carlisle during 1764; and then Dean of Peterborough until his death on 22 February 1791.

References

1723 births
1791 deaths
Alumni of Balliol College, Oxford
Deans of Carlisle
Deans of Peterborough